Carl Friedrich Zöllner (17 May 1800 – 25 September 1860)  was a German composer and choir director. After studying at the Thomasschule zu Leipzig, he started teaching voice.  He wrote organ variations on God Save the Queen and wrote several songs. His son was composer Heinrich Zöllner.

References

External links

1800 births
1860 deaths
German Romantic composers
German choral conductors
German male conductors (music)
19th-century classical composers
19th-century conductors (music)
German male classical composers
19th-century German composers